Sefer Daja (Tirana, 1897 - 1977) was an Albanian bejtexhi, popularised for his beit poems in the volume Bejte nga Sefer Daja, written by Haxhi Deliu.
He was well known as the public toilet cleaner in Tirana that died of hunger.

References

People from Tirana
People from Scutari vilayet
Albanian poets
1897 births
1977 deaths